NBA Jam is a basketball video game developed and published by Midway for arcades in 1993. It is the first entry in the NBA Jam series. The project leader for this game was Mark Turmell.

NBA Jam was the third basketball video game released by Midway, after TV Basketball (1974) and Arch Rivals (1989). The gameplay of NBA Jam is based on Arch Rivals, which was also a 2-on-2 basketball game. However, it was the release of NBA Jam that brought mainstream success to the genre.

The release of NBA Jam popularized a subgenre of basketball games which were based around fast, action-packed gameplay and exaggerated realism, a formula which Midway would also later apply to the sports of hockey (NHL Open Ice and later NHL Hitz), American football (NFL Blitz), and baseball (MLB Slugfest).

Gameplay

NBA Jam, which features two-on-two basketball, is one of the first real playable basketball arcade games and is also one of the first sports games to feature NBA-licensed teams and players, and their real digitized likenesses.

A key feature of NBA Jam is the exaggerated nature of the play – players can jump extremely high and make slam dunks that defy both human capabilities and the laws of physics. There are no fouls, free throws, or violations except goaltending and 24-second violations. This means the player is able to freely shove or elbow opponents out of the way. Additionally, if a player makes three baskets in a row, the character becomes "on fire" and has an unlimited turbo and increased shooting precision. The "on fire" mode continues until the other team scores, or until the player who is "on fire" scores four additional consecutive baskets while "on fire".

The game is filled with Easter eggs, special features, and players activated by initials or button/joystick combinations. For example, pressing A five times and right five times on any Genesis controller will activate "Super Clean Floors". This feature causes characters to fall if they run too fast or change direction too quickly. Players can also enter special codes to unlock hidden players, ranging from US President Bill Clinton to Hugo, the Charlotte Hornets mascot. On the arcade machine, there is also a hidden "tank" game that allows the player to drive a tank and shoot enemy tanks for a minute. Just before the court is shown at the start of a game, joysticks 1 and 2 must be moved down and all six of their buttons held down.

Featured teams and players
The original arcade version of NBA Jam features team rosters from the 1992–93 NBA season and the console versions use rosters from the 1993–94 NBA season. More up-to-date rosters were available in subsequent ports released for the Sega CD, Game Boy, and Game Gear in 1994. Midway did not secure the license to use Michael Jordan's name or likeness (as Jordan himself owns the rights to his name and likeness and not the NBA), and as such he was not available as a player for the Chicago Bulls or any other team. Another notable absence from the home versions is Shaquille O'Neal, who was in the arcade version as a member of the Orlando Magic (and who later followed in Jordan's footsteps in buying his name and likeness from the NBA). New Jersey Nets guard Dražen Petrović and Boston Celtics forward Reggie Lewis, both of whom died after the release of the arcade version, were also removed from the home versions.

A limited edition version of the game with an additional team composed of Gary Payton and Michael Jordan was developed primarily for Jordan and Payton's personal use.

During development, Godzilla and Bart Simpson were planned to be secret characters, but were ultimately scrapped.

Development 
The game was devised after Midway's previous arcade release Total Carnage failed to meet sales expectations. Lead designer and programmer Turmell wanted to develop a game with a wider appeal and decided to mix the digitized graphics of some of Midway's previous titles to create a title similar to Midway's previous basketball game Arch Rivals. Midway was able to procure a license from the NBA, paying royalties of $100 for each unit sold. The NBA initially reacted negatively to the game feeling that an arcade game was wrong for the branding; however, after a second pitch, they eventually became convinced of its potential.
In one of Midway's original pitch videos to the NBA, they stated that they planned on including various additional features. These included different camera angles, tips from coaches, instant replays and a first-person view on fast breaks. None of these features were included in the final game. The graphics for the NBA players were created from digitized video footage of several amateur basketball players, including future NBA player Stephen Howard. These players were available as secret characters in certain versions of the game. 
Turmell recounted, "My big ideas in NBA Jam were to do the spectacular dunks and two-on-two basketball, but the whole game was very much a team effort. For instance, someone else came up with the idea of attributes, giving different players different abilities."

In 2008, Turmell confirmed a long-held suspicion that the game had a bias against the Chicago Bulls. According to Turmell, a Detroit Pistons fan, the game was programmed such that the Bulls would miss last-second shots in close games against the Pistons.

Iguana Entertainment handled the conversion of the game to home consoles. According to Iguana president Jeff Spangenberg, including the time spent on learning the then-new PlayStation hardware, the PlayStation version took six months to develop. The Saturn version took longer to develop, in part because of the greater complexity of the hardware, but also because Iguana Entertainment did not have access to the Sega Graphics Library operating system (which was used to facilitate the Saturn versions of Virtua Fighter 2 and Virtua Cop, among other games). The Game Gear and PlayStation ports were programmed by Iguana UK employee Chris Kirby, with the Sega Saturn version coded by Darren Tunnicliff. Steve Snake, who would later create the Genesis emulator Kega Fusion, made the 32X version.

The game was written entirely in assembly language. The game had a marketing budget of $10 million.

Legacy

Tournament Edition
An update named NBA Jam: Tournament Edition (commonly referred to as NBA Jam: T.E.) was released in arcades. NBA Jam: T.E. included updated rosters, new features and Easter eggs combined with the same gameplay of the original. Jon Hey created new music specifically for NBA Jam: T.E. to replace the original NBA Jam music. Teams now consisted of three players (though only two could be on the court at any time; in practice, the extra player meant greater variety in lineups), with the exception of the new "Rookies" team, which consists of five players, all picked in the 1994 NBA draft. Players could be substituted into the game between quarters. The game also featured new hidden teams and secret playable characters. Early versions of the game included characters from Midway's Mortal Kombat games. Players were also assigned more attributes, including clutch and fatigue levels. In addition, the game also introduced features such as a "Tournament" mode that turned off computer assistance and on-court hot spots that allowed for additional points or special slam dunks.

The test version of NBA Jam: Tournament Edition included eight hidden characters which were taken out of the final version at the request of the NBA: Elviscious, Grim Reaper, Kongo, Raiden, Reptile,  Scorpion, Sub-Zero and Tim Coman. Midway also stated they would update all test version cabinets to remove these characters.

In addition to the arcade version, NBA Jam: Tournament Edition was ported to the Super NES, Genesis, Genesis 32X, Game Boy, Game Gear, Sega Saturn, PlayStation, and Atari Jaguar, with the PlayStation port serving as a North American launch title.

Ports and sequels
The NBA Jam games were ported to many home video game consoles and PC, published by Acclaim. The console versions were well known for featuring many new secret characters; the home versions of Jam T.E. even allowed the player to use then-President Bill Clinton, First Lady Hillary Clinton, Vice President Al Gore, and, on the Atari Jaguar version, Atari's Vice President of Software Development Leonard Tramiel.

Acclaim later ended up winning the exclusive rights to use the NBA Jam name, and without Midway's involvement, released a sequel, NBA Jam Extreme, in 1996. It features 3D graphics and Marv Albert doing commentary. The game received mixed reception. Acclaim continued to use the NBA Jam name on subsequent console games until the company closed in 2004, although the games were only mildly popular.

Midway released their own sequel in arcades in 1996, NBA Hangtime, which was better received. Hangtime featured refined 2D gameplay and added a create-a-player option among other new features. An update called NBA Maximum Hangtime was subsequently released for the arcade, and the game was ported to home systems. Midway later produced further entries in its NBA series with 3-D graphics, beginning with NBA Showtime: NBA on NBC in 1999, followed by the console-exclusive NBA Hoopz in 2001, which expanded the gameplay to 3-on-3, and the NBA Ballers series.

EA Sports, having acquired rights to be name, released a new version of NBA Jam, with the Wii version released on October 5, 2010, and PlayStation 3 and Xbox 360 versions released the following month. Original NBA Jam creator Mark Turmell was hired to work on this new version in conjunction with EA Vancouver. Following the game's critical and commercial success, a follow-up, NBA Jam: On Fire Edition was released on October 4, 2011 on PSN and XBLA on October 5, 2011.

In 2020, Tastemakers LLC released a 3/4 scale replica of the original NBA Jam cabinet featuring emulated versions of the original arcade game, along with Tournament Edition and Hangtime, with newly added online play.

Other Midway sports series

Midway also applied similar themes and designs to their other sports games, beginning with the 1996 hockey game NHL Open Ice and the American football game NFL Blitz, which proved to be a major success. Midway had also developed Power Up Baseball around 1996 based on the same concepts as NBA Jam, but it was cancelled as they found the game did not test well due to the large number of paid plays users would need to complete one game, among other issues. 

After making the switch to develop console games exclusively, Midway continued to produce sports titles with arcade-style gameplay, with sequels to NFL Blitz, a new hockey series called NHL Hitz, the MLB Slugfest series of baseball games, and the soccer game RedCard 2003.

Reception

The game became exceptionally popular, and generated a significant amount of money for arcades after its release. In the United States, it topped the monthly RePlay charts for upright arcade cabinets from April 1993 through summer to October 1993. RePlay listed it as America's top-grossing arcade game of Summer 1993. NBA Jam was America's highest-grossing arcade game of 1993. Individual machines at the time were earning up to $2400 per week, setting the all-time record for the highest per-unit arcade earnings in the United States. In Japan, Game Machine listed NBA Jam on their August 15, 1993 issue as the fourth most successful upright arcade unit of the month. The game grossed over  worldwide in its first twelve months.

On consoles in the United States, it was the top-selling Sega Genesis, Super NES and Game Gear game in February 1994, the top Genesis and Game Gear game in March, and the top Game Gear game in April 1994. It was the second best-selling home video game of 1994 in the United States (below Donkey Kong Country), with the Genesis version outselling the Super NES version. The console ports sold  copies in 1994, more than  cartridges worldwide by February 1995, and over  within a year. , the Genesis and Super NES versions sold a combined  copies worldwide.

Critical response
The four reviewers of Electronic Gaming Monthly gave the Super NES version a unanimous score of 9 out of 10 and their "Game of the Month" award. They praised its graphics, sounds, and the four-player mode, and remarked that the gameplay is easy to pick up and incredibly fun even for people who don't like sports games. Reviewing the Genesis version, Mike Weigand commented that "The voices are fuzzy and the colors are a bit bland", but that the game is still very fun. EGM rated the Game Gear version as weaker than either the SNES or Genesis versions, chiefly due to the removal of most of the jams, but said it is still worthwhile for Game Gear owners.

GamePro praised the Sega CD version's updated roster, more intuitive controls, and improved audio with "more voice samples, more music, and more sound effects than any other home version." However, they criticized the graphics as much worse than in the Super NES and arcade versions, complained of long load times, and concluded that the improvements were not enough to make the game worthwhile for those who already had a home version of NBA Jam.

GamePro commented of the Game Boy version, "Obviously the GB is far too limited a system to capture more than a fraction of what made NBA Jam an arcade smash, but at least it has that fraction."

Next Generation reviewed the Sega CD version of the game, and stated that "It's good, but it could have been so much more."

In 1995, Flux magazine rated the arcade version 19th in their "Top 100 Video Games." In 1996, Next Generation listed NBA Jam at number 99 in their "Top 100 Games of All Time", commenting that "Despite it having been flogged to death by Acclaim at home and now in the arcades, NBA Jam is still a terrific game, especially in the arcade with four players." In 2017, Gamesradar ranked NBA Jam 23rd on its "Best Sega Genesis/Mega Drive games of all time." IGN listed the NBA Jam 36th on its "Top 100 SNES Games."  They praised the game saying: "Professional basketball has never been as much fun as in NBA Jam".  They also praised the secret playable characters.

Tournament Edition

Reviewing the 32X version, GamePro opined that people who already own the Genesis version should not bother with the 32X one, but summarized that "Despite some sloppy rough edges, Jam's classic run-n-gun gameplay brings much-needed excitement to the cart-starved 32X." The two sports reviewers of Electronic Gaming Monthly said the 32X version was the most accurate conversion of the arcade game to date. Next Generation reviewed the 32X version of NBA Jam: Tournament Edition, rating it three stars out of five, and stated that "NBA Jam T.E. is a good game, but it is just as good on the Genesis and SNES, and shows no signs of 32-bit gaming. While there have been some decent games for the 32X, this is yet one more of the many disappointments."

A reviewer for Next Generation, after enumerating the improvements Tournament Edition offers over the original game, concluded, "What does all this equal? Same game (albeit a good one), new package! Only Jam fanatics and the two guys who don't own the original need slam down the cash for this rehash."

A GamePro critic covered the Tournament Edition release and was less forgiving of the Game Boy version's technical flaws, complaining of sprites with too little detail to discern which player is which during play, and summarizing the conversion as "a pale imitation of an otherwise great game."

Electronic Gaming Monthlys two sports reviewers highly praised the PlayStation version as a precise conversion with good enhancements. Next Generation concurred and declared it the best version of the game to date. Videohead of GamePro disagreed, saying the PlayStation version conspicuously lacks graphical details and voice clips from the arcade version and suffers from overly tough A.I.

Steve Merrett of Sega Saturn Magazine gave the Saturn version an 89%, declaring it "A perfect conversion of one of the most original coin-ops around." He particularly praised the reliance on timing and precision over complex button combinations, and the game's high playability in general, saying it "ensures a return for late-night rematches whilst the graphically-stunning games are gradually coated in dust." Both Sega Saturn Magazine and Maximum were impressed with the Saturn version's retention of all the considerable content of the arcade version. However, the reviewer for Maximum added that it nonetheless failed to offer any game-changing features that would make buying it worthwhile to anyone who already owned the Genesis or Super NES version.

GamePro commented that the Jaguar version is competent but far inferior to the PlayStation version. The two sports reviewers of Electronic Gaming Monthly were slightly more pleased with the conversion but felt it pointless since there had already been so many versions of the game, and the Jaguar release fails to offer anything new.

Entertainment Weekly gave NBA Jam: Tournament Edition an A and wrote that "The latest upgrade, NBA Jam Tournament Edition, of the two-on-two in-your-face hoopfest boasts the participation of fully one third of the NBA's roster. And the graphics and sound are astounding-not only is playing this game like watching TV, but so is listening to it, with unnervingly accurate commentary that precisely follows the action of the game. Loads of hidden tricks and guest appearances make this one an arcade slam dunk."

In 1995, Total! ranked the game 8th in its "Top 100 SNES Games". In 2018, Complex named NBA Jam Tournament Edition 44th on their "The Best Super Nintendo Games of All Time."

Popular culture
In popular sports culture, the phrases "He's heating up", "He's on fire", and "Boomshakalaka!" are identified with NBA Jam. In the game, these catch-phrases describe when a player hits two or three shots in a row.  When a player is "on fire", the ball literally catches fire and singes the net. Voiced by Tim Kitzrow, the announcer is reminiscent of Marv Albert and has contributed numerous memorable lines to the basketball lexicon. The NBA Jam script was written solely by Jon Hey, although Kitzrow has stated that the lines were largely improvised.

NBA Jam also incorporates a slogan from Spike Lee's alter-ego in his 1986 film She's Gotta Have It, Mars Blackmon, who was also featured in a Nike basketball shoe television commercial at the time. The NBA Jam commentator asks, "Is it the shoes?" after a player performs spectacularly. The 2010 game features a nod to this particular piece of commentary, when the commentator (Kitzrow reprising the role) sometimes exclaims "It's gotta be the shoes!" under similar circumstances.

The upbeat, funky music written by Jon Hey was inspired by sports music themes and has been compared to George Clinton's P-Funk All Stars. Funkadelic's 1979 "(Not Just) Knee Deep" shares the most similarity with the music of NBA Jam but was recorded more than a decade before NBA Jams music was written. The likeness of George Clinton was used as the character "P. Funk" in the console versions of NBA Jam: Tournament Edition. The original NBA Jam arcade release and the NBA Jam T.E. arcade release had different music for the title screen and for each quarter.

In July 2009, Mortal Kombat creator Ed Boon revealed (on Twitter) that a Mortal Kombat court was to be hidden in a console port of NBA Jam or NBA Hangtime.

In October 2019, writer Reyan Ali published a book on the game/series for Boss Fight Books called NBA Jam documenting the game's development, success and impact on Midway afterward.

See also 
 Double Dribble (1986 video game)
 Arch Rivals (1989)

References

External links
Game Information

NBA Jam Oral History | Where Are They Now? - SI.com

1993 video games
Arcade video games
Atari Jaguar games
NBA Jam
Game Boy games
Game Gear games
Midway video games
Sega CD games
Sega Genesis games
Super Nintendo Entertainment System games
Tiger Electronics handheld games
Video games with digitized sprites
Acclaim Entertainment games
VSDA Game of the Year winners
Torus Games games
Multiplayer and single-player video games
Video games developed in the United States